Umran is a Turkish unisex given name. People named Umran include:

 Ümran Ertiş (born 1996), Turkish female Paralympian table tennis player 
 Umran Inan (born 1950), Turkish scientist
 Umran Javed (born 1979), British terrorist

Surname 
 Muhammad Umran (1922–1972), former Syrian defense minister

See also
 Imran (disambiguation)
 Umran Dergisi, Turkish magazine

Turkish masculine given names